Hey! Sinamika is a 2022 Indian Tamil-language romantic comedy film written by Madhan Karky and directed by Brinda in her directorial debut. The title of the film was taken from a song in O Kadhal Kanmani. Produced by Jio Studios and Global One Studios, the film stars Dulquer Salmaan, Aditi Rao Hydari and Kajal Aggarwal. Featuring music composed by Govind Vasantha and cinematography by Preetha Jayaraman, the venture began production in March 2021. It is a remake of the 2008 Argentine film A Boyfriend for My Wife.

Plot 
Yaazhan and Mouna fall head over heels in love with each other and they get married. After two years of marital life, Mouna becomes annoyed by Yaazhan's overly affectionate and talkative nature. She decides to separate from him to live a life of her own and on her own terms. One day, Yaazhan's meets a psychiatrist named Dr. Kajal Malarvizhi, where Mouna devises a scheme with Malarvizhi to make him fall in love with her so that she can use it as an excuse to get divorced. However, Malar strikes a good rapport with him and the two form a close bond. Malarvizhi begins to fall in love with Yaazhan, and although he is unaware, he blossoms with his newfound career as an RJ and with his friends. Meanwhile, Mouna realizes she is losing Yaazhan and schemes to separate them, setting Malarvizhi up to be discovered by Yaazhan.

Malarvizhi professes her love to Yaazhan, who is confused and troubled. Mouna tells Yaazhan the truth about their scheme and that Malarvizhi's love was not real. Yaazhan is devastated and leaves telling Mouna that she gave up on him and doesn't deserve his love anymore. He starts divorce proceedings, leaving Mouna heartbroken. Malarvizhi is happy at first, as she thinks Yaazhan reciprocates her love. However, Yaazhan tells her that though he can't be with his wife, he does not see anyone else in her place. Yaazhan tells Malarvizhi that though she lied that he believed she was truthful in her time with him and leaves a heartbroken Malarvizhi. Mouna learns about Yaazhan's conversation and realizes how much she had hurt Malarvizhi, and apologizes to her for involving her in the scheme and causing her heartbreak.

Six months later, Mouna and Yaazhan meet at family court, where he ignores her. Mouna asks Yaazhan about why he smiled the day he saw Malarvizhi sitting opposite him at the coffee house. Yaazhan tells her that he was thinking about Mouna the day he met her for the first time in similar cafè, and didn't even realize it was Malarvizhi who was sitting opposite to him because he was thinking of Mouna. As Yaazhan starts walking away, Mouna realizes how much he had loved her and she had tested him. She runs after him and begs for forgiveness, telling him how much she loves him, where the two reunite. Malarvizhi takes up Yaazhan's RJ job and decides to spend the rest of her life fixing troubled marriages through her newfound job.

Cast

Production 
In January 2020, it was reported that Jio Studios had signed dance choreographer Brinda to make her directorial debut through a romantic comedy film featuring Dulquer Salmaan, Aditi Rao Hydari and Kajal Aggarwal in the lead roles. Titled Hey Sinamika, as inspired from a song from Mani Ratnam's O Kadhal Kanmani (2015), the film was launched at an event in Chennai during mid-March 2020. Madhan Karky was credited as the film's story, screenplay, dialogues and lyric writer, while Govind Vasantha and Preetha Jayaraman were announced as the film's music composer and cinematographer, respectively.

The shoot commenced in Chennai after the launch ceremony, with filmmakers K. Bhagyaraj and Mani Ratnam being guest directors for the first shot. Actresses Suhasini and Khushbu, close friends of Brinda, also participated in the first shot by handling the clapperboard. The film's shoot continued in Chennai with Salmaan and Hydari throughout March 2020 until it was stopped as a result of the COVID-19 pandemic in India. The shoot of the film recommenced in early November 2020, with Kajal Aggarwal joining the set after her wedding. The shoot of the film was completed in Chennai during late December 2020.

Music
The songs of the film is composed by Govind Vasantha.

Release
Hey Sinamika was released in theatres on 3 March 2022. The film was originally planned to release on 12 February 2021 as Valentine's Day special, but was postponed due to ongoing Covid-19 Pandemic in India. The film was then scheduled to be released in July 2021 but was again delayed. The film was scheduled to release in December 2021 but was again postponed. Then the film was scheduled to release on 25 February 2022, but again got postponed for the same reason.

The film opened to positive reviews, and it couldn't perform up to the mark. The film released on 31 March 2022 on Netflix and JioCinema.

Reception 
Hey Sinamika was released in theatres on 3 March 2022. M Suganth critic from Times of india gave 3 out of 5 stars and noted that " Hey Sinamika works better as a comedy than as a drama"The Hindu critic gave a mixture of reviews and said that " Dulquer Salmaan and Aditi Rao Hydari salvage this messy love triangle".A critic from Indian Express gave 2 stars out of 5 stars.

However, Pinkvilla critic noted that " On the whole, Hey Sinamika is a one time watch this weekend and it has some romantic scenes between the couple to pep up your weekend. Dulquer, Aditi and Kajal are definitely a spark on the screen."

Sudhir Srinivasan from Cinema Express gave 3 out of 5 stars and said that "Invested performances lift this interesting, but flawed romance"Hindustan Times critic noted that "Hey Sinamika needed to be a breezy romantic comedy but what it ends up becoming is a problematic love triangle." P Ayyappadas critic from Onmanorama said that "One of those films you really need to watch with your family.

References

External links 

2022 films
2022 romantic comedy films
2020s Tamil-language films
Indian romantic musical films
Indian romantic comedy-drama films
Films shot in Tamil Nadu
Films shot in Chennai
Films set in Chennai
Films set in India
2022 directorial debut films
Films scored by Govind Vasantha
Indian remakes of foreign films